Osvaldo Paulo Ventura (born 3 August 1996), commonly known as Zé Ventura, is an Angolan footballer who currently plays as a midfielder for Desportivo Huíla.

Career statistics

Club

Notes

International

References

1996 births
Living people
Angolan footballers
Angola international footballers
Association football midfielders
Girabola players
C.D. Primeiro de Agosto players
C.D. Huíla players